The New Zealand national cricket team toured England and Scotland during the northern summer of 2008. They played three Test matches and five One Day Internationals and one Twenty20 International against England.  Although New Zealand lost the Test series 2–0, they triumphed in the ODI series, winning three matches and losing one.  The only Twenty20 match saw an England victory.

Test series

1st Test

2nd Test

3rd Test

Twenty20 Series

Twenty20

ODI series

1st ODI

2nd ODI

3rd ODI

4th ODI

The fourth ODI was marred with controversy. Paul Collingwood appealed a controversial run out of Grant Elliott after Elliott had collided with Ryan Sidebottom and injured himself. While this action initially drew criticism from the New Zealand dressing room, Daniel Vettori admitted during the post-game press conference that the Black Caps' reaction was "a little bit over the top" Collingwood also admitted that he probably made the wrong decision in not withdrawing the appeal. Later, the ICC banned Collingwood for four ODI matches due to England's slow over rate, with England having bowled only 47 overs in the required time. The ICC also fined the rest of the English team 15% of their match fee. Kevin Pietersen was called upon to take over as captain for the final game.

5th ODI

Other ODIs

New Zealand v Ireland

New Zealand v Scotland

Tour Matches

List-A : Marylebone Cricket Club v New Zealanders

First Class : Kent v New Zealanders

First Class : Essex v New Zealanders

First Class : England Lions v New Zealanders

First Class : New Zealanders v Northamptonshire

List-A : New Zealanders v Worcestershire

Notes

References

External links 
 New Zealand cricket team in the UK in 2008 at ESPNcricinfo

2008 in English cricket
2008
International cricket competitions in 2008
2008 in New Zealand cricket